Alcibíades Rojas McRay (born 15 August 1986) is a former Panamanian football player.

Club career
Nicknamed Pepón, Rojas has played the majority of his career in his native Panama, but also had spells with Colombian side Academia, Juventud Retalteca in Guatemala and Honduran outfit Victoria.

In June 2013 he joined reigning champions Sporting SM and after his time in jail returned to Chorrillo. In December 2014 he was snapped up by San Francisco, only to be released by the club ahead of the 2015 Apertura.

International career
Rojas made his debut for Panama in a January 2013 friendly match against Guatemala and has, as of November 2013, earned a total of 6 caps, scoring 1 goal. He has represented his country in 2 FIFA World Cup qualification matches and at the 2013 Copa Centroamericana.

International goals
Scores and results list Panama goal tally first.

Arrested on kidnapping allegations
On 16 November 2013, Rojas was arrested by Panamanian police after they captured an alleged gang of kidnappers, Rojas being one of them. In April 2014 he announced his return to professional football after spending several months in prison.

References

External links

1986 births
Living people
Sportspeople from Panama City
Association football forwards
Panamanian footballers
Panama international footballers
2013 Copa Centroamericana players
C.D. Plaza Amador players
Unión Deportivo Universitario players
C.D. Victoria players
Atlético Chiriquí players
Sporting San Miguelito players
San Francisco F.C. players
Panamanian expatriate footballers
Expatriate footballers in Colombia
Expatriate footballers in Guatemala
Expatriate footballers in Honduras
Liga Nacional de Fútbol Profesional de Honduras players